Andy Murray was the defending champion, but lost to Milos Raonic in the semifinals.
Eighth-seeded Kei Nishikori won the title beating Milos Raonic in the final 7–6(7–5), 3–6, 6–0, and in doing so became the first home grown winner of the title since Toshiro Sakai in 1972.

Seeds

Draw

Finals

Top half

Bottom half

Qualifying

Seeds

Qualifiers

Lucky loser
  Ivo Karlović

Draw

First qualifier

Second qualifier

Third qualifier

Fourth qualifier

External links
Main draw
Qualifying draw

Rakuten Japan Open Tennis Championships - Singles
2012 Singles